The name Nalgae has been used to name four tropical cyclones in the northwestern Pacific Ocean. It was submitted by North Korea and it means a wing.

 Tropical Storm Nalgae (2005) (T0506, 06W) – stayed at sea
 Typhoon Nalgae (2011) (T1119, 22W, Quiel) – impacted the northern Philippines a few days after Typhoon Nesat devastated the same area
 Tropical Storm Nalgae (2017) (T1711, 13W) – stayed at sea
 Tropical Storm Nalgae (2022) (T2222, 26W, Paeng) – devastated the Philippines killing 150 people

Pacific typhoon set index articles